The 1999 Women's European Cricket Championship was an international cricket tournament held in Denmark from 19 to 21 July 1999. It was the fifth edition of the Women's European Championship, and the second to be held in Denmark (after the inaugural 1989 edition). All matches at the tournament held One Day International (ODI) status.

Four teams participated, with the hosts, Denmark, joined by the three other European members of the International Women's Cricket Council (IWCC) – England, Ireland, and the Netherlands. England, which had dominated all other editions of the tournament, did not send a full-strength team. Despite this, England went on to win all three of its round-robin matches, claiming a fifth consecutive title. For the first time since 1989, no final was played, although both England and Ireland were undefeated going into their final match, making that a de facto final. Ireland's Clare Shillington was named player of the tournament, while two Englishwomen, Kate Lowe and Laura Harper, led the tournament in runs and wickets, respectively. All matches at the tournament were played in at the Nykøbing Mors Cricket Club.

Squads

Points table

Source: CricketArchive

Fixtures

Statistics

Most runs
The top five run scorers (total runs) are included in this table.

Source: CricketArchive

Most wickets

The top five wicket takers are listed in this table, listed by wickets taken and then by bowling average.

Source: CricketArchive

References

1999
International women's cricket competitions in Denmark
1999 in women's cricket
International cricket competitions from 1997–98 to 2000
July 1999 sports events in Europe
1999 in English cricket
cricket
cricket
cricket
cricket